Banbridge railway station may refer to:

 Banbridge railway station (Banbridge Junction Railway), in service 1859–1863
 Banbridge railway station (Banbridge, Lisburn and Belfast Railway), in service 1863–1956